Reichenbach an der Fils is a town in the Esslingen district in Baden-Württemberg in southern Germany.

History
Reichenbach was mentioned for the first time in 1268. In 1906, its name was changed to "Reichenbach an der Fils" to avoid confusion with other towns or villages with the same name.

Transportation
Reichenbach is located 25 km southeast of Stuttgart, on Bundesstraße 10. Reichenbach's train station is on the Fils Valley Railway between Stuttgart and Ulm.

Economy
Due to a structural change in the German economy during the 1990s, the textile mill Otto (est. 1879) had to close down. The lathe manufacturer Traub was taken over by Esslinger INDEX-Werke and had to lay off a large number of workers in the process. Other businesses include the corrugated board manufacturer Seyfert, the conveyance company Nagel, the electric appliances manufacturer Electrostar and the plastic processing plant Volz.

Famous people
Diem Brown (1982–2014) possibly born in Reichenbach an der Fils, as this Reichenbach is the largest one with this name in the former West Germany and very few Americans would live in East Germany in the 1980s as it was communist country. http://www.tmz.com/person/diem-brown/
 Karl Brönnle (1879–1952), Reichsbahnrat, Member of Landtag (KPD)
 Wolfgang Frank (1951–2013), football player and -trainer
 Sabine Fohler (born 1963), politician (SPD), former Member of Landtag

Twin towns
Sainte-Savine, France

Sites of interest
Brunnengasse
Mauritiuskirche

External links
Official website of the town (German)
Weatherstation in Reichenbach with webcam (German)

References

Towns in Baden-Württemberg
Esslingen (district)